James Frederick Allen (born 1950) is a computational linguist recognized for his contributions to temporal logic, in particular Allen's interval algebra. He is interested in knowledge representation, commonsense reasoning, and natural language understanding, believing that "deep language understanding can only currently be achieved by significant hand-engineering of semantically-rich formalisms coupled with statistical preferences". He is the John H. Dessaurer Professor of Computer Science at the University of Rochester

Biography
Allen received his Ph.D. from the University of Toronto in 1979, under the supervision of C. Raymond Perrault, after which he joined the faculty at Rochester. At Rochester, he was department chair from 1987 to 1990, directed the Cognitive Science Program from 1992 to 1996, and co-directed the Center for the Sciences of Language from 1996 to 1998. He served as the Editor-in-Chief of Computational Linguistics from 1983–1993. Since 2006 he has also been associate director of the Florida Institute for Human and Machine Cognition.

Academic life

TRIPS project
The TRIPS project is a long-term research to build generic technology for dialogue (both spoken and 'chat') systems, which includes natural language processing, collaborative problem solving, and dynamic context-sensitive language modeling. This is contrast with the data driven approaches by machine learning, which requires to collect and annotate corpora, i.e. training data,  firstly.

PLOW agent
PLOW agent is a system that learns executable task models from a single collaborative learning session, which integrates wide AI technologies including deep natural language understanding, knowledge representation and reasoning, dialogue systems, planning/agent-based systems, and machine learning. This paper won the outstanding paper award at AAAI in 2007.

Selected works

Books
Allen is the author of the textbook Natural Language Understanding (Benjamin-Cummings, 1987; 2nd ed., 1995).

He is also the co-author with Henry Kautz, Richard Pelavin, and Josh Tenenberg of Reasoning About Plans (Morgan Kaufmann, 1991).

Articles
 2007. PLOW: A Collaborative Task Learning Agent. (with Nathanael Chambers et al) AAAI'07
 won the outstanding paper award at AAAI in 2007.
 2006. Chester: Towards a Personal Medication Advisor. (with N. Blaylock, et al) Biomedical informatics 39(5)
 1998. TRIPS: An Integrated Intelligent Problem-Solving Assistant. (with George Ferguson) AAAI'98
 1983. Maintaining Knowledge about Temporal Intervals. CACM 26, 11, 832-843

Awards and honors
In 1991 he was elected as a fellow of the Association for the Advancement of Artificial Intelligence (1990, founding fellow).

In 1992 he became the Dessaurer Professor at Rochester.

References

External links
 James F. Allen's Home Page
 Google Scholar, h-index is 59.

Florida Institute for Human and Machine Cognition people
Living people
1950 births
American computer scientists
Linguists from the United States
American logicians
Artificial intelligence researchers
Computational linguistics researchers
Fellows of the Association for the Advancement of Artificial Intelligence
University of Rochester faculty
University of Toronto alumni
Fellows of the Cognitive Science Society
Natural language processing researchers